Philip Epstein may refer to:
Philip G. Epstein (1909–1952), American screenwriter
Philip Michael Epstein (born 1942), Canadian family law lawyer